San Roque Church, also called the Diocesan Shrine of Our Lady of Solitude of Porta Vaga is a Latin Rite Catholic church in Cavite City on Luzon island, the Philippines. It enshrines Our Lady of Solitude of Porta Vaga, an icon that appeared after an apparition of the Blessed Virgin Mary.

History
Sitting at the southern part of the colonial walled city of Cavite, conquering Spaniards in 1571 found the place a forested swamp. Its location was very strategic for trade as it was surrounded by water, a likely reason why many Chinese frequented the place. In 1573, when the invading Chinese pirate Limahong was repulsed by the Spaniards, he retreated to the northern part of San Roque, today the Philippine military base of Sangley Point. In 1614, the province of Cavite was placed under a politico-military government, and San Roque was made an independent pueblo. 
 
Sometime in 1700, a badly damaged ship stopped for repairs at a certain place in Cavite called Sapa-sapaan. Aboard the ship was an image of Saint Roch which the crew venerated as their patron, as the custom was to have saints on board a ship during a voyage to serve as protectors. Before work began, the ship’s captain ordered that the image of Saint Roch be placed in the nipa hut that served as the town’s chapel, dedicated to Saint Margaret. After the ship had been repaired, the captain asked the workers to re-enshrine the image on the ship, but the crew could not move the statue. They told the captain of this, and they decided to leave the image in the chapel. The story spread around and since then, Saint Roch was made patron and namesake of the town.

List of Parish Priests

References

Other references
 Barcelona, Mary Anne. Ynang Maria: A Celebration of the Blessed Virgin Mary in the Philippines. Edited by Consuelo B. Estepa, P.D. Pasig: Anvil Publishing, Inc., 2004.
 Cavite Studies Center-De La Salle University Dasmariñas. CAVITE Cultura e Historia. Edited by Teresita P. Unabia and Victor Immanuel R. Cuarto. Cavite: Cavite Historical Society, Inc., 2002.
 Archdiocesan Archives of Manila: (Document Nos. 92 LGE1C9 1751-1752A; 109–10, LGE 1010 1767–1771; 182, LGE 1 C 8 - 1750 1742 A; 250, LGE 1 C 9 - 1747 1756; 294, LGE 1 C 9 - 1751-1752 A; 321, LGE 1 C 8 - 1737 1742; 436, Libro del Govierno Ecclesiastico 1 C 8 1737 - 1750; SV4A1 1805 - 1806 A; 475, 522, 960 LGE 1010 1767 - 1771; and 20 S V 4aL 1786 - 87 B)
 Don Gervacio Pangilinan. Historica de Cavite, mss.
 Aviado, Lutgarda. Madona of the Philippines. [n.imp.]
 Samonte, Godofredo, Odyssey of the Virgin. Souvenir Program Cavite Fiesta, 1964.
 San Agustin, Narciso La Tradicional Fiesta de Cavite. Souvenir Program, Cavite Fiesta, 1949.

Roman Catholic churches in Cavite
Buildings and structures in Cavite City
Spanish Colonial architecture in the Philippines
Roman Catholic churches completed in 1586
Churches in the Roman Catholic Diocese of Imus